Vasilije Baćović (born 11 May 1996) is a Montenegrin professional basketball player, currently playing as a center and a power forward for Studentski centar of the Montenegrin League and the ABA League.

External links 
 Profile at abaliga.com
 Profile at eurobasket.com
 Profile at beobasket.net

Living people
1996 births
ABA League players
KK Budućnost players
KK Lovćen players
KK Studentski centar players
Montenegrin men's basketball players
Centers (basketball)
Power forwards (basketball)